ReAniMate 2.0: The CoVeRs eP is an EP by the American hard rock band Halestorm. It was released in the United States on October 15, 2013 as a follow up to ReAniMate: The CoVeRs eP (2011). ReAniMate 2.0 features Halestorm's covers of six songs, all from different artists.

Track listing

Personnel 
Per liner notes
Halestorm
 Lzzy Hale – vocals, guitar
 Arejay Hale – drums
 Joe Hottinger – guitars
 Josh Smith – bass guitar

Recording personnel
 Howard Benson – producer; keyboards and programming on "Get Lucky"
 Mike Plotnikoff – producer, mixing engineer, recording engineer
 Chris Lord-Alge – mixing on "Get Lucky"
 Hatsukazu "Hatch" Inagaki – additional engineering
 Paul DeCarli – additional engineering and digital editing; programming on "1996"
 Ernesto Olvera – assistant engineer
 Keith Armstrong – assistant engineer
 Nik Karpen – assistant engineer
 Brad Townsend – assistant engineer
 Andrew Schubert – assistant engineer
 Ted Jensen – mastering engineer

Chart positions

References

2013 EPs
Atlantic Records EPs
Covers EPs